is a former Japanese football player and manager. He played for Japan national team.

Club career
Maeda was born in Kyoto on May 13, 1954. After graduating from Hosei University, he joined Furukawa Electric in 1977. The club won the champions in 1985–86 Japan Soccer League and 1986 JSL Cup and 1986 Asian Club Championship. He retired in 1989. He played 209 games and scored 35 goals in the league. He was selected Best Eleven in 1980 and 1982.

National team career
On August 4, 1975, when Maeda was a Hosei University student, he debuted for Japan national team against Bangladesh. In 1978, he was selected Japan for 1978 Asian Games. In early 1980s, he served as captain. He played 65 games and scored 11 goals for Japan until 1984.

Coaching career
After retirement, Maeda started coaching career at JEF United Ichihara (former Furukawa Electric) in 1994. He managed youth team at the club in 1997. In 1998, he moved to Yokogawa Electric and managed the club until 1999. In 2003, he signed with Mito HollyHock and managed the club until 2007.

Club statistics

National team statistics

Managerial statistics

References

External links
 
 Japan National Football Team Database

1954 births
Living people
Hosei University alumni
Association football people from Kyoto Prefecture
Japanese footballers
Japan international footballers
Japan Soccer League players
JEF United Chiba players
Japanese football managers
J2 League managers
Mito HollyHock managers
Footballers at the 1978 Asian Games
Association football midfielders
Asian Games competitors for Japan